Carson City is a 1952 American Western film directed by Andre DeToth and starring Randolph Scott, Lucille Norman, and Raymond Massey.

Based on a story by Sloan Nibley, the film is about a railroad construction engineer whose plans to build a railroad line between Nevada's Carson City and Virginia City are met with hostility by the locals, who feel the trains will attract outlaws. Filmed on location at Iverson Ranch, Bell Ranch, and Bronson Canyon in Griffith Park, Carson City was Warner Bros.' first film shot in WarnerColor.

Plot
Mine owner William Sharon keeps having his gold shipments held up by a gang of bandits. Sharon hires banker Charles Crocker, who happens to have connections in the Central Pacific Railroad, to build a spur line from Virginia City to Carson City, so that the gold can be shipped by rail.

Silent Jeff Kincaid is the railroad engineer. However, there is opposition to the railroad, chiefly from another mine owner, Big Jack Davis. He doesn’t own a working mine; he finds it easier to rob from the other owners. Davis is the brains behind the gang holding up Sharon’s shipments. The technique is to hold up the stagecoach and then provide food and champagne for the passengers, who then don’t care that the gold is robbed.

Kincaid vows to rid Carson City of the bandits, but they frame him on a murder charge. In the climax, Kincaid has to contend with a suspicious landslide which kills some of his workers, trapping others, and a gold bullion heist.

Cast
 Randolph Scott as Silent Jeff Kincaid
 Lucille Norman as Susan Mitchell
 Raymond Massey as A. J. 'Big' Jack Davis
 Richard Webb as Alan Kincaid
 James Millican as Jim Squires
 Larry Keating as William Sharon
 George Cleveland as Henry Dodson
 William Haade as Hardrock Haggerty
 Don Beddoe as Zeke Mitchell
 Thurston Hall as Charles Crocker
 Vince Barnett as Henry

Production

Filming locations
 Iverson Ranch, 1 Iverson Lane, Chatsworth, Los Angeles, California, USA 
 Bell Ranch, Santa Susana, California, USA 
 Bronson Canyon, Griffith Park, 4730 Crystal Springs Drive, Los Angeles, California, USA

Background

Though it is never mentioned by name, the Virginia and Truckee Railroad, which ran from Reno to Carson City, may have served as the inspiration for this story. One branch of the real-world railroad ran from Carson City to Virginia City. The railroad as a whole was built to serve the silver mines of Nevada, primarily Virginia City's Comstock Lode. The section that ran from Carson City to Virginia City was restored and reopened in 2009, as a heritage railroad.

References

External links
 
 
 
 

1952 films
1952 Western (genre) films
American Western (genre) films
Warner Bros. films
Films directed by Andre DeToth
Films scored by David Buttolph
Films set in Nevada
Rail transport films
1950s English-language films
1950s American films